Leo Rhabdouchos or Rhabduchus (fl. 917) was a Byzantine nobleman and diplomat.

Biography
Leo was apparently a relative to the ruling Macedonian dynasty, and a brother-in-law of the famed diplomat Leo Choirosphaktes. In 917, he was governor (strategos) of the theme of Dyrrhachium, and was sent to the Serbian ruler Petar Gojniković (r. 892–917) to persuade him to attack Simeon I of Bulgaria (r. 893–927), with whom the Byzantines were at war. Leo was successful, but the Serbian attack failed and Petar was taken captive. From the De Administrando Imperio of Emperor Constantine VII Porphyrogennetos (r. 913–959), it is also known that Leo was later promoted from his rank of protospatharios to that of magistros, and became Logothete of the Drome (foreign minister).

References

Sources

Further reading

 

10th-century Byzantine people
Byzantine governors of Dyrrhachium
Byzantine diplomats
Magistroi
Protospatharioi
Logothetai tou dromou
10th-century diplomats